The Center for the Development of Recycling (CDR) is a university-based, non-profit, environmental research and service organization. The CDR operates the recycling and reuse website RecycleStuff.org for the counties of Santa Clara and San Mateo, a recycling call center and household hazardous waste appointment system for Santa Clara County, and has completed over 60 contracted projects. The CDR is located in the Department of Environmental Studies at San Jose State University (SJSU). Faculty-managed service-learning university students collect and populate the website with data, respond to information requests from the public, and work on recycling and waste reduction projects for the community. CDR student's provide the community with a cost-effient public service.  Hundreds of its service learning students have completed internships with local government and industry and over 100 have transitioned from college to sustainable materials management careers with industry and government.

Organization
CDR operates with a part-time Director, three compensated part-time students who serve as Administrative Manager, Project Manager, HHW Manager, and a staff of student service-learning interns who earn academic credit. CDR Director is a Department of Environmental Studies faculty member who is responsible for all activities including management of staff, projects, equipment, budget, and adherence to University regulations. The San Jose State University Foundation manages accounting and payroll services.

Website
The CDR’s website, RecycleStuff.org, assists users to find locations for recycling, reuse, and the donation of goods. It lists specific services available to recycle or reuse over 2000 material types from over 1600 companies and local governments.  Links and documents are provided to assist users with access to multiple information sources that address nearly any question about recycling and waste management.  The site features specific information about recycling and reuse services provided by private businesses, local government, non-profits, and landfills.

History
The CDR was founded in 1989 by Bruce Olszewski. In 1991, CDR bridged personnel and equipment resources of SJSU with Santa Clara County and its 15 cities that resulted in an alliance to provide cost-effective recycling information services for County residents and businesses that also created student service-learning opportunities. In 1992, the CDR began operating the County of Santa Clara Recycling Hotline. CDR added a donor funded website in 1999. In 2017, CDR expanded its organization to include the County of San Mateo.

Recycling Hotline
Since 1992, the CDR has operated the County of Santa Clara Recycling Hotline under contract with the County of Santa Clara. The hotline was created to assist residents with finding a reuse or recycling center for any recyclable item they may have. The student-operated hotline serves the 16 jurisdictions of Santa Clara County which include: 
Campbell, 
Cupertino, 
Gilroy, 
Los Altos, 
Los Altos Hills, 
Los Gatos, 
Milpitas, 
Monte Sereno, 
Morgan Hill, 
Mountain View, 
Palo Alto, 
San Jose, Santa Clara, Saratoga, 
Sunnyvale, and the unincorporated areas of Santa Clara County.

Projects
Faculty-managed students work on environment-related projects for businesses, government agencies, consultants, and non-profit organizations. CDR has contracted to work on urban water conservation and recycling projects involving residential and commercial sectors, hotels, multi-family buildings, multi-tenant office buildings and conducting various types of surveys. CDR is also involved in community outreach to promote recycling and proper household hazardous waste disposal among Santa Clara County residents, and assists in expanding the recycling program at SJSU.

Publications
CDR makes recycling and waste management-related documents available to the public. Recycling and recycling-related guides can be downloaded for free from their web site (www.recyclestuff.org). The CDR annually updates and releases the following publications:
Stop Junk Mail Kit
Home Composting Brochure

References

External links
Center for the Development of Recycling

Recycling organizations
Recycling in the United States
Environmental education
Environmental studies organizations